Tillandsia alvareziae is a species in the genus Tillandsia. This species is endemic to Mexico.

References

alvareziae
Endemic flora of Mexico